Nancy Tillman (born 1954) is an American author and illustrator of children's books.

Tillman's picture books focus on the love parents have for their children with animals. Her books On the Night You Were Born, Wherever You Are, My Love Will Find You, The Crown on Your Head, I'd Know You Anywhere, and You're Here for a Reason were New York Times best-sellers.

On the Night You Were Born was originally self-published, then re-issued by the imprint Feiwel & Friends, which has published Tillman's subsequent books.

Tillman was born in Birmingham, Alabama in 1954, and grew up in Columbus, Georgia.

Bibliography
 On the Night You Were Born, 2005
 It’s Time to Sleep, My Love, by Eric Metaxas and illustrated by Nancy Tillman, 2008
 Tumford the Terrible, 2008
 The Wonder of You, 2008
 The Spirit of Christmas, 2009
 Wherever You Are My Love Will Find You, 2010
 The Crown on Your Head, 2011
 Tumford's Rude Noises, 2012
 I'd Know You Anywhere, My Love, 2013
 The Heaven of Animals, 2014
 You're Here for a Reason, 2015
 You and Me and the Wishing Tree, 2016
You're All Kinds of Wonderful, 2017
You Are Loved, 2018
I Knew You Could Do It!, 2019
Because You're Mine, 2020

References

External links

American children's writers
Living people
1954 births
American women children's writers
21st-century American writers
21st-century American women writers
Writers from Birmingham, Alabama
Writers from Columbus, Georgia